Copacabana is a town and municipality in the Colombian department of Antioquia. Copacabana is part of The Metropolitan Area of the Aburrá Valley.

References

Municipalities of Antioquia Department
The Metropolitan Area of the Aburrá Valley